William Lofts Cornwell (27 August 1838 — 21 April 1915) was an English first-class cricketer.

Cornwell as born in August 1838 at Bottisham, Cambridgeshire. He was active in Cambridgeshire cricket following the demise of the Cambridge Town and County Club in 1848. A middle-order batsman and wicket-keeper, he played first-class cricket for Cambridgeshire on five occasions between 1864 and 1868, beginning with his debut against Yorkshire at Parker's Piece. His five first-class matches yielded him just 22 runs with a highest score of 12, while in his capacity as wicket-keeper he took three catches and made a single stumping. Outside of cricket, Cornwell was employed as a servant at the University of Cambridge by St John's College. He died at Bottisham in April 1915, two hours after falling ill.

References

External links

1838 births
1915 deaths
People from Bottisham
English cricketers
Cambridge Town Club cricketers
British servants